Chelyconus is a subgenus  of sea snails, cone snails, marine gastropod mollusks in the genus Conus, family Conidae, the cone snails and their allies.

In the new classification of the family Conidae by Puillandre N., Duda T.F., Meyer C., Olivera B.M. & Bouchet P. (2015), Chelyconus has become a subgenus of Conus: Conus (Chelyconus) Mörch, 1852  represented as Conus Thiele, 1929.

Distinguishing characteristics
The Tucker & Tenorio 2009 taxonomy distinguishes Chelyconus from Conus in the following ways:

 Genus Conus sensu stricto Linnaeus, 1758
 Shell characters (living and fossil species)
The basic shell shape is conical to elongated conical, has a deep anal notch on the shoulder, a smooth periostracum and a small operculum. The shoulder of the shell is usually nodulose and the protoconch is usually multispiral. Markings often include the presence of tents except for black or white color variants, with the absence of spiral lines of minute tents and textile bars.
Radular tooth (not known for fossil species)
The radula has an elongated anterior section with serrations and a large exposed terminating cusp, a non-obvious waist, blade is either small or absent and has a short barb, and lacks a basal spur.
Geographical distribution
These species are found in the Indo-Pacific region.
Feeding habits
These species eat other gastropods including cones.

 Subgenus Chelyconus Mörch, 1852
Shell characters (living and fossil species)
The protoconch is multispiral, the shell is ovate to elongated conical in shape, the spire is conical to convex, the shoulders are rounded, and the surface of the shell has minute ridges.  The anterior notch may be absent to moderate in depth, and the shell has a moderate to shallow anal notch.  The periostracum is smooth, and the operculum is small.
Radular tooth (not known for fossil species)
The anterior section of the radula is much longer than posterior section, and the waist is not obvious. A basal spur is absent, the barb and blade are short.  The accessory process is well developed and is not hooked on the distal end.
Geographical distribution
One species is found in the Atlantic and the other occurs in the Eastern Pacific region.
Feeding habits
These species are piscivorous (meaning that they prey on fish).

Species list
This list of species is based on the information in the World Register of Marine Species (WoRMS) list. Species within the subgenus Chelyconus include:
 Chelyconus achatinus (Gmelin, 1791): synonym of Conus (Pioconus) achatinus Gmelin, 1791, represented as  Conus achatinus Gmelin, 1791
 Chelyconus ermineus (Born, 1778): synonym of  Conus (Chelyconus) ermineus Born, 1778 represented as Conus ermineus Born, 1778
 Chelyconus fulmen (Reeve, 1843): synonym of Conus (Pioconus) fulmen Reeve, 1843, represented as Conus fulmen Reeve, 1843
 Chelyconus kinoshitai Kuroda, 1956: synonym of Conus (Afonsoconus) kinoshitai Kuroda, 1956, represented as  Conus kinoshitai (Kuroda, 1956)
 Chelyconus profundorum Kuroda, 1956: synonym of Conus profundorum (Kuroda, 1956): synonym of Profundiconus profundorum (Kuroda, 1956)
 Chelyconus purpurascens (G. B. Sowerby I, 1833): synonym of Conus (Chelyconus) purpurascens (G. B. Sowerby I, 1833 represented as Conus purpurascens G. B. Sowerby I, 1833

Significance of "alternative representation"
Prior to 2009, all species within the family Conidae were placed in one genus, Conus. In 2009 however, J.K. Tucker and M.J. Tenorio proposed a classification system for the over 600 recognized species that were in the family. Their classification proposed 3 distinct families and 82 genera for the living species of cone snails. This classification was based upon shell morphology, radular differences, anatomy, physiology, cladistics, with comparisons to molecular (DNA) studies. Published accounts of genera within the Conidae that include the genus Chelyconus include J.K. Tucker & M.J. Tenorio (2009), and Bouchet et al. (2011).

Testing in order to try to understand the molecular phylogeny of the Conidae was initially begun by Christopher Meyer and Alan Kohn, and is continuing, particularly with the advent of nuclear DNA testing in addition to mDNA testing.

However, in 2011, some experts still prefer to use the traditional classification, where all species are placed in Conus within the single family Conidae: for example, according to the current November 2011 version of the World Register of Marine Species, all species within the family Conidae are in the genus Conus. The binomial names of species in the 82 cone snail genera listed in Tucker & Tenorio 2009 are recognized by the World Register of Marine Species as "alternative representations."  Debate within the scientific community regarding this issue continues, and additional molecular phylogeny studies are being carried out in an attempt to clarify the issue.

All this has been superseded by the new classification of the family Conidae by Puillandre N., Duda T.F., Meyer C., Olivera B.M. & Bouchet P. (2015)

References

  Tucker J.K. & Tenorio M.J. (2009) Systematic classification of Recent and fossil conoidean gastropods. Hackenheim: Conchbooks. 296 pp.

Further reading 
 Kohn A. A. (1992). "Chronological Taxonomy of Conus, 1758-1840". Smithsonian Institution Press, Washington and London.
 Monteiro A. (ed.) (2007). The Cone Collector 1: 1-28.
 Berschauer D. (2010). Technology and the Fall of the Mono-Generic Family The Cone Collector 15: pp. 51-54
 Puillandre N., Meyer C.P., Bouchet P., and Olivera B.M. (2011), Genetic divergence and geographical variation in the deep-water Conus orbignyi complex (Mollusca: Conoidea), Zoologica Scripta 40(4) 350-363.

External links
 To World Register of Marine Species
  Gastropods.com: Conidae setting forth the genera recognized therein.

Conidae